PayPal Melbourne Fashion Festival is owned by the Melbourne Fashion Festival, a not-for-profit organization that started in 1996. The organization showcases the profile of Australian designers locally and globally, whilst inspiring consumers and retailers of the Australian fashion industry. PayPal is its Principal Partner and currently owns the naming rights. It was previously known as the L'Oreal Melbourne Fashion Festival and Virgin Australia Melbourne Fashion Festival.

The Festival has taken a stand on showcasing diversity on its runways, enforcing no animal fur on its runways and helping democratize traditional fashion events. This has been achieved by appealing to the general public. Its consumer-friendly operational model is very different from fashion weeks seen around the world. It’s a 'see now buy now' model in terms of what is found on the Festival runways is uniquely accessible. Mostly, the designer clothing is all available in store or online.   

More than just fashion, the Festival has developed into a consumer-focused festival that provides fashion runway shows, business-related seminars and workshops, entertainment, music performance, and activates various precincts across Melbourne that can be accessed by the general public.

It is part of the Victorian Major Events calendar of events and is helping to drive tourism to Melbourne often known as Australia's fashion capital. Over 15% of its public ticketing comes from outside of Victoria, the State of Australia where Melbourne is the Capital. 

It is described as celebration of fashion, beauty, business and creative endeavour for everyone to enjoy. The Festival is generally held in mid-to-late March in Melbourne each year over the course of several days. 

In 2023, the Melbourne Fashion Festival caused controversy after models wore material printed in Arabic spelling out "allah", the Arabic word for god. The garments were designed by label Not A Man's Dream, which was subsequently moved by festival organizers. The organizers also issued an apology for allowing the garments to be displayed and causing offence.

References

External links
 

Fashion events in Australia
Fashion festivals